Rebecca Victoria Hardy (née; Reyes; ; born August 6, 1986) is an American professional wrestler and model. She is best known for her recurring appearances with Total Nonstop Action Wrestling from 2014 to 2017.

Early life 
Hardy was born in Flushing, a neighborhood in the north central part of Queens, New York City. She is of Puerto Rican heritage. She has three older brothers and an older sister, Suzanne. Her father is a wrestling personality better known as "Señor Benjamin".

Modeling and acting career 
Hardy began her career in modeling, performing nationally with the Amira Mor International Entertainment Company, a belly dance troupe, with whom she also made several belly dance instructional DVDs. In 2005, Hardy held a supporting role in the off-Broadway musical, Secrets of the Desert. The show toured several off-Broadway venues, including the Duke Theatre on 42nd street in Times Square, and the DiCapo Opera House. Other notable venues Hardy has performed at Queens Theatre in the Park and New York City’s Radio City Music Hall, where she performed for The Beatles drummer, Ringo Starr. Reyes appeared in various television programs and music videos, including Midnight Spike (Spike TV), Date Patrol, Faking It and Más Maíz, a music video featuring N.O.R.E. and Fat Joe.

Hardy appeared in a nude pictorial in Playboy magazine, "The Girls of Montauk', in July 2007, and as “Cyber Girl of the Week” in the July 2010 edition of the Playboy Cyber Club. She was later named “Cyber Girl of the Month” for November 2010. Sky has also appeared in GQ, Esquire Magazine, Supermodels Unlimited, and STUFF. Rebecca was also interviewed in MTV’s True Life: I’m a Sports Fanatic, as the NY Giants Girl, airing on September 19, 2009. The show chronicled her involvement as a fan of the New York Football Giants. She sells a line of football fashion handbags via one of her websites, which also promotes her self-proclaimed NY Giants fanatic status as the NY Giants Girl. Hardy was named Miss Howard Stern TV for the month of December 2009 and was voted by Sirius Radio’s Howard Stern fans, as “Miss Howard TV of the Year 2009″. In 2013 Hardy starred in the film Pro Wrestlers vs Zombies.

Professional wrestling career

Lucha Libre USA (2010–2012) 
In 2010, Hardy conducted interviews and commentary for the MTV2 program, Lucha Libre USA: Masked Warriors, a show focusing on the transition of lucha libre and related organizations to the United States. On March 19, 2011, Hardy made her professional wrestling debut at a Lucha Libre USA show under the ring name "Rebecca Sky", where she teamed up with Nikki Corleone and ODB against Chrissy Cialis, Jacqueline Moore and Tigresa Caliente. On the June 18 episode of LLUSA TV Tapings, Hardy teamed up with Chrissy Cialis and Vladimiro in a losing effort to Mini Park, Octagoncito and Pequeno Halloween in a mixed tag team match. In October, Hardy lost to Lady Luck in a lingerie match. She would return in 2012 during the second season, mainly teaming with Shane Helms in mixed tag team matches.

Shine Wrestling (2012−2013) 

She made her debut for the new women's promotion Shine Wrestling on the inaugural show, as a face against Jayme Jameson, in a winning effort. On August 17, Hardy began a rivalry with Jessicka Havok after being viciously attacked by Havok with a chair injuring her after losing to her in a match. On October 19, Hardy faced off against Kellie Skater in a singles match, in a winning effort.

On January 11, Hardy was defeated by Havok after Matt Hardy threw the towel in to stop Havok's attack. On March 23, Hardy defeated Jessicka Havok in a Career vs. Respect match, causing Havok to shake Hardy's hand and respect her and ending the storyline rivalry between Hardy and Havok.

Independent circuit (2011–2015) 
On July 1, 2012, Hardy made her independent circuit debut at Extreme Air Wrestling where she teamed with Paul London and Brian Kendrick to defeat Miss Jackie and The World's Greatest Tag Team. In 2012, Sky took on Jayme Jameson for the NWA Mid-Atlantic Ladies Championship on two occasions and lost both times. On March 9, Hardy was part of an infamous triple threat match which included Brittney Savage and Spyra Andover and was mentioned by  Botchamania. With being engaged to Matt Hardy, she has appeared at several OMEGA events which Hardy owns. Hardy debuted for promotion Family Wrestling Entertainment at No Limits, where Hardy lost to Ivelisse Vélez.

Hardy made appearances in Vendetta Pro Wrestling competing singles match defeating Tab Jackson, Hudson Envy and Amber O'Neal.

Total Nonstop Action Wrestling (2014–2017) 
In the year of 2014, Hardy appeared for TNA in May through the company's One Night Only PPV's mainly on Knockouts Knockdown 2 in a match against Velvet Sky in a winning effort also qualifying for the gauntlet match later that night. However, she was eliminated by Angelina Love.

Hardy appeared for TNA again in late 2015 at Bound for Glory celebrating with real life husband, Matt Hardy after he won his match for the TNA World Heavyweight Championship. Sky returned to Impact Wrestling on January 5, 2016, and watched as Hardy was defeated by Ethan Carter III in the finals of the TNA World Title Series. On the January 19 episode of Impact Wrestling, both herself and Hardy turned into  villains after Tyrus helped Hardy defeat EC3 to capture the TNA World Heavyweight Championship.

On the September 1 episode of Impact Wrestling, The Hardys started a feud with Decay, involving her feuding with Decay's valet Rosemary, turning her into a face. On February 27, 2017, Hardy departed TNA, along with Matt and Jeff.

WWE (2018) 
On the March 12 episode of Raw it was announced that Hardy would make an appearance in the Ultimate Deletion match between her husband Matt and Bray Wyatt at the Hardy Compound. She also appeared the following week on Raw.

Personal life 

In 2008, Hardy was sentenced to probation, a fine, and community service for opposing an officer without violence when police stopped her vehicle because it had a broken taillight in 2007 in Florida.

On October 5, 2013, she married fellow professional wrestler Matt Hardy. On June 23, 2015, they had their first child, a son. On June 8, 2017, Matt and Reby welcomed their second son. On December 4, 2019, Reby gave birth to their third son. On January 8, 2021, it was announced that they are expecting a fourth child. On July 11, 2021, Reby gave birth to their fourth child, a daughter.

Filmography

References

Further reading 
Queens Courier: "Reby Sky: NY Giants No.1 fan", newspaper article on Reby Sky as the NY Giants Girl

External links 

1986 births
American dancers
American female dancers
American female professional wrestlers
American people of Puerto Rican descent
American radio personalities
Television personalities from New York City
Female models from New York (state)
Living people
Puerto Rican female professional wrestlers
People from Flushing, Queens
Professional wrestling announcers
Professional wrestlers from New York (state)
Sportspeople from Queens, New York
Dancers from New York (state)
Twitch (service) streamers
Professional wrestlers from New York City